Kanjō-Dōri-Higashi Station (環状通東駅) is a Sapporo Municipal Subway in Higashi-ku, Sapporo, Hokkaido, Japan. The station number is H04.

Platforms

Surrounding area
 Bus Terminal Kanjodori-Higashi
 Otomo Park
 Honryu Temple (本龍寺)
 Sapporo village Shrine
 Sapporo village Folk Museum
 Higashi heated swimming pool
 Sapporo Kita 13-Jo Higashi Post Office
 Sapporo Food Center, Motomachi branch
 Sapporo City Agricultural Cooperative Association (JA Sapporo), Kita branch
 GEO store, Kanjodorihigashi branch
 Apamanshop, Kanjodorihigashi branch
 North Pacific Bank, Kita 15 branch
 Hokkaido Bank, Kita 15 branch
 Sorachi shinkin Bank, Sapporo Higashi branch

External links

 Sapporo Subway Stations

Railway stations in Japan opened in 1988
Railway stations in Sapporo
Sapporo Municipal Subway
Higashi-ku, Sapporo